Chanditala Assembly constituency is an assembly constituency in the Hooghly District in the Indian state of West Bengal.

Overview
As per orders of the Delimitation Commission, No. 194 Chanditala Assembly constituency is composed of the following:Dankuni Municipality(Before 2010 grampanchayat) & Bhogabatipur, Gangadharpur, Krishnarampur, Kumirmorah and Nababpur gram panchayats of Chanditala I community development block Baksa, Barijhati, Chanditala, Garalgacha, Janai, Monaharpur, Mrigala and Naiti gram panchayats of Chanditala II community development block.

Chanditala Assembly constituency is part of No. 27 Sreerampur (Lok Sabha constituency).

Members of Legislative Assembly

Election results

2021
In 2021 West Bengal Assembly Election, AITC candidate Swati Khandoker defeated her nearest rival  Yash Dasgupta of BJP by 41,347 votes

2016

.# Swing calculated on Congress+Trinamool Congress vote percentages taken together in 2006.

1977-2006
In the 2006 and 2001 state assembly elections Bhaktaram Pan of CPI(M) won the Chanditala assembly seat defeating Swati Khandoker of Trinamool Congress in 2006 and Amit Mitra of Trinamool Congress in 2001. Contests in most years were multi cornered but only winners and runners are being mentioned. Akbar Ali Khandakar of Congress defeated Malin Ghosh of CPI(M) in 1996. Malin Ghosh of CPI(M) defeated Akbar Ali Khandakar of Congress in 1991, Ali Hossain Jamadar of Congress in 1987, Nisith Kamal of Congress in 1982 and Seikh Abdur Rahim of Congress in 1977.

1962-1972
Safiulla of Congress won in 1972. Kaji Safiulla of CPI(M) won in 1971. Mohammad Abdul Latif, Independent, won in 1969 and 1967. Kanai Lall Dey of Congress won in 1962.

References

Assembly constituencies of West Bengal
Politics of Hooghly district